Caesium monoxide, (Cs2O), often simply Caesium oxide, is the simplest and most common oxide of the caesium. It forms yellow-orange hexagonal crystals.

Uses
Caesium oxide is used in photocathodes to detect infrared signals in devices such as image intensifiers, vacuum photodiodes, photomultipliers, and TV camera tubes
L. R. Koller described the first modern photoemissive surface in 1929–30 as a layer of caesium on a layer of caesium oxide on a layer of silver. It is a good electron emitter; however, its high vapor pressure limits its usefulness.

Reactions
Elemental magnesium reduces caesium oxide to elemental caesium, forming magnesium oxide as a side-product:

Cs2O  +  Mg  →   2Cs + MgO

Cs2O is hygroscopic, forming the corrosive CsOH on contact with water.

References

Caesium compounds
Oxides